Yurieski Torreblanca Queralta (born March 14, 1989) is a Cuban freestyle wrestler who competes at 86 kilograms. A three-time Pan American Champion, Torreblanca won gold medals at the 2019 Pan American Games and the 2018 Central American and Caribbean Games.

Career 

At the 2017 Pan American Wrestling Championships in Lauro de Freitas, Brazil, he won the gold medal in the men's 86 kg event.

In 2018, he won the silver medal in the men's 86 kg event at the Pan American Wrestling Championships in Lima, Peru. At the 2018 Central American and Caribbean Games held in Barranquilla, Colombia, he won the gold medal in the men's 86 kg event. In 2019, he won the gold medal in the men's 86 kg event at the Pan American Games held in Lima, Peru.

He competed in the 86kg event at the 2022 World Wrestling Championships held in Belgrade, Serbia.

Achievements

References

External links 
 

Living people
Place of birth missing (living people)
Cuban male sport wrestlers
Wrestlers at the 2019 Pan American Games
Medalists at the 2019 Pan American Games
Pan American Games medalists in wrestling
Pan American Games gold medalists for Cuba
Central American and Caribbean Games gold medalists for Cuba
Competitors at the 2018 Central American and Caribbean Games
Central American and Caribbean Games medalists in wrestling
1989 births
Pan American Wrestling Championships medalists
20th-century Cuban people
21st-century Cuban people